There are forty-eight mammal species in Belarus, of which two are endangered, four are vulnerable, and three are near threatened. One of the species listed for Belarus can no longer be found in the wild.

The following tags are used to highlight each species' conservation status as assessed by the International Union for Conservation of Nature:

Some species were assessed using an earlier set of criteria. Species assessed using this system have the following instead of near threatened and least concern categories:

Order: Rodentia (rodents) 

Rodents make up the largest order of mammals, with over 40% of mammalian species. They have two incisors in the upper and lower jaw which grow continually and must be kept short by gnawing. Most rodents are small though the capybara can weigh up to 45 kg (100 lb).
Suborder: Sciurognathi
Family: Castoridae (beavers)
Genus: Castor
 Eurasian beaver, C. fiber 
Family: Sciuridae (squirrels)
Subfamily: Sciurinae
Tribe: Pteromyini
Genus: Pteromys
 Siberian flying squirrel, P. volans  possibly extirpated
Family: Gliridae (dormice)
Subfamily: Leithiinae
Genus: Dryomys
 Forest dormouse, D. nitedula
Genus: Muscardinus
 Hazel dormouse, M. avellanarius
Subfamily: Glirinae
Genus: Glis
 European edible dormouse, G. glis
Family: Cricetidae
Subfamily: Arvicolinae
Genus: Arvicola
European water vole, A. amphibius 
Genus: Clethrionomys
 Bank vole, C. glareolus
Genus: Microtus
 Field vole, M. agrestis
 Common vole, M. arvalis
 Tundra vole, M. oeconomus LC
Family: Muridae (mice, rats, voles, gerbils, hamsters, etc.)
Subfamily: Murinae
Genus: Apodemus
 Striped field mouse, A. agrarius
 Yellow-necked mouse, A. flavicollis
 Wood mouse, A. sylvaticus LC
 Ural field mouse, A. uralensis
Genus: Micromys
 Eurasian harvest mouse, M. minutus

Order: Lagomorpha (lagomorphs) 

The lagomorphs comprise two families, Leporidae (hares and rabbits), and Ochotonidae (pikas). Though they can resemble rodents, and were classified as a superfamily in that order until the early twentieth century, they have since been considered a separate order. They differ from rodents in a number of physical characteristics, such as having four incisors in the upper jaw rather than two.
Family: Leporidae (rabbits, hares)
Genus: Lepus
European hare, L. europaeus 
Mountain hare, L. timidus

Order: Erinaceomorpha (hedgehogs and gymnures) 

The order Erinaceomorpha contains a single family, Erinaceidae, which comprise the hedgehogs and gymnures. The hedgehogs are easily recognised by their spines while gymnures look more like large rats.

Family: Erinaceidae (hedgehogs)
Subfamily: Erinaceinae
Genus: Erinaceus
 Southern white-breasted hedgehog, E. concolor 
 Northern White-breasted Hedgehog, E. roumanicus

Order: Soricomorpha (shrews, moles, and solenodons) 

The "shrew-forms" are insectivorous mammals. The shrews and solenodons closely resemble mice while the moles are stout-bodied burrowers.
Family: Soricidae (shrews)
Subfamily: Crocidurinae
Genus: Crocidura
Lesser white-toothed shrew, C. suaveolens 
Subfamily: Soricinae
Tribe: Nectogalini
Genus: Neomys
 Eurasian water shrew, Neomys fodiens
Tribe: Soricini
Genus: Sorex
 Laxmann's shrew, Sorex caecutiens
 Eurasian pygmy shrew, Sorex minutus
Family: Talpidae (moles)
Subfamily: Talpinae
Tribe: Desmanini
Genus: Desmana
 Russian desman, D. moschata  extirpated

Order: Chiroptera (bats) 

The bats' most distinguishing feature is that their forelimbs are developed as wings, making them the only mammals capable of flight. Bat species account for about 20% of all mammals.
Family: Vespertilionidae
Subfamily: Myotinae
Genus: Myotis
Bechstein's bat, M. bechsteini 
Pond bat, M. dasycneme 
Greater mouse-eared bat, M. myotis 
 Natterer's bat, Myotis nattereri 
Subfamily: Vespertilioninae
Genus: Barbastella
Western barbastelle, B. barbastellus 
Genus: Nyctalus
Greater noctule bat, N. lasiopterus 
Lesser noctule, N. leisleri

Order: Carnivora (carnivorans) 

There are over 260 species of carnivorans, the majority of which feed primarily on meat. They have a characteristic skull shape and dentition.
Suborder: Feliformia
Family: Felidae (cats)
Subfamily: Felinae
Genus: Felis
 European wildcat, F. silvestris 
Genus: Lynx
 Eurasian lynx, L. lynx 
Suborder: Caniformia
Family: Canidae (dogs, foxes)
Genus: Vulpes
 Red fox, V. vulpes 
Genus: Canis
Gray wolf, C. lupus 
Family: Ursidae (bears)
Genus: Ursus
 Brown bear, U. arctos 
Family: Mustelidae (mustelids)
Genus: Lutra
Eurasian otter, L. lutra 
Genus: Martes
 Beech marten, M. foina 
Genus: Meles
European badger, M. meles 
Genus: Mustela
Stoat, M. erminea 
Steppe polecat, M. eversmannii 
European mink, M. lutreola  extirpated
Least weasel, M. nivalis 
European polecat, M. putorius 
Genus: Neogale
American mink, N. vison  introduced

Order: Perissodactyla (odd-toed ungulates)

The odd-toed ungulates are browsing and grazing mammals. They are usually large to very large, and have relatively simple stomachs and a large middle toe.

Family: Equidae (horses etc.)
Genus: Equus
 Wild horse, E. ferus  reintroduced
 Przewalski's horse, E. f. przewalskii  reintroduced

Order: Artiodactyla (even-toed ungulates) 

The even-toed ungulates are ungulates whose weight is borne about equally by the third and fourth toes, rather than mostly or entirely by the third as in perissodactyls. There are about 220 artiodactyl species, including many that are of great economic importance to humans.
Family: Cervidae
Subfamily: Capreolinae
Genus: Alces
 Moose, A. alces  
Genus: Capreolus
Roe deer, C. capreolus 
Subfamily: Cervinae
Genus: Cervus
Red deer, C. elaphus 
Genus: Dama
 European fallow deer, D. dama LC introduced
Family: Bovidae
Genus: Bison
European bison, B. bonasus  reintroduced
Genus: Bos
Aurochs, B. primigenius 
Family: Suidae
Genus: Sus
Wild boar, S. scrofa

See also
List of chordate orders
List of prehistoric mammals
Lists of mammals by region
Mammal classification
Mammals described in the 2000s

Notes

References
 

Belarus
Mammals
Mammals
Belarus